Ahafo Ano South West is one of the constituencies represented in the Parliament of Ghana. It elects one Member of Parliament (MP) by the first past the post system of election. Ahafo Ano South West is located in the Ahafo Ano South district of the Ashanti Region of Ghana.

Boundaries 
The seat is located within the Ahafo Ano South District of the Ashanti Region of Ghana.

Members of Parliament

Elections

See also 
 List of Ghana Parliament constituencies

References 

Parliamentary constituencies in the Ashanti Region